Alexander Polukhin (born December 19, 1988) is a Russian former professional ice hockey forward.

Polukhin began his career with HC Dynamo Moscow where he played 46 games in the 2007–08 Russian Superleague season and 14 games in the 2008–09 KHL season. He also played in the second-tier Vysshaya Liga and Supreme Hockey League for Gazprom-OGU Orenburg, HC Ryazan, Dynamo Tver and Buran Voronezh.

References

External links

1988 births
Living people
Buran Voronezh players
HC Dynamo Moscow players
Gazprom-OGU Orenburg players
Russian ice hockey forwards
HC Ryazan players
Ice hockey people from Moscow